HMS Donegal was a 101-gun screw-driven first-rate ship of the line of the Royal Navy, launched on 23 September 1858 at Devonport Dockyard.

Upon commissioning she sailed to Liverpool to recruit a crew. She then joined the Channel Squadron, where she took part in a number of fleet reviews. In November 1861 she was one of a number of ships transporting troops to Mexico, and in February 1862 she assisted the recovery of equipment and stores from the wreck of her sister HMS Conqueror. On 28 October 1859 William Hall was awarded his Victoria Cross aboard the Donegal whilst she was anchored in Queenstown.

She spent several years as a coastguard vessel at Liverpool. She took the last surrender of the American Civil War on 6 November 1865 when the CSS Shenandoah surrendered after travelling 9,000 miles (14,500 km) to do so.  The Shenandoah had originally been in the Pacific Ocean when news reached her of the end of the Civil War, necessitating such a long voyage. On her next assignment she carried Vice-Admiral Sir Henry Kellett and a replacement crew to relieve HMS Ocean, then on the China Station under Vice-Admiral Henry Keppel. She was then commanded by Captain William Hewett, seconded by John Fisher. In 1870 she became a tender to HMS Duke of Wellington, which was then a receiving ship in Portsmouth. Donegal was paid off on 30 September 1870.

On 14 January 1886, Donegal was hulked and merged into the Torpedo School at Portsmouth, and her name was changed to Vernon. Between 1888 and 1892 she was commanded by Captain Arthur Knyvet Wilson. On 23 April 1895 she was moved to Portchester Creek, along with the rest of the hulks making up the school.

She remained in this role until the torpedo school moved onshore in 1923, and Donegal was sold for scrapping on 18 May 1925 to Pounds, of Portsmouth. Some of the timbers and panelling were used to rebuild the Prince of Wales public house (reopened as The Old Ship in 2007) in Brighouse in 1926.

Notes

References

History of HMS Donegal
Another report of the Shenandoah's surrender

External links
 

Conqueror-class ships of the line
Ships of the line of the Royal Navy
1858 ships
Victorian-era ships of the line of the United Kingdom